Spawn or spawning may refer to:
 Spawn (biology), the eggs and sperm of aquatic animals

Arts, entertainment, and media
 Spawn (character), a fictional character in the comic series of the same name and in the associated franchise
 Spawn: Armageddon, a 2003 video game based on the comic series for sixth generation consoles
 Spawn: In the Demon's Hand, a 1999 arcade game based on the comic series
 Spawn (1997 film), a cinema adaptation of the comic series
 Spawn (1999 video game), a video game for the Game Boy Color
 Spawn (upcoming film), an upcoming American superhero film
 Spawn: Godslayer, a spin-off comic series
 Todd McFarlane's Spawn (also known as Spawn: The Animated Series), an American adult animation television series which aired on HBO from 1997 through 1999
 Spawn (novel), a 1983 horror novel by Shaun Hutson
 Spawn, a 1993 album by Rise Robots Rise
 "Spawn Again", a song on the 1999 album Neon Ballroom by Silverchair
 Spawn (Again): A Tribute to Silverchair, a 2017 compilation album by various UNFD artists
 Spawning (video games), the in-game creation or re-creation of an entity

Other uses
 Spawn (computing), a function that executes a child process
 SPAWN (Salmon Protection and Watershed Network), a project of the Turtle Island Restoration Network (TIRN), a United States 501(c)(3) nonprofit environmental organization
 Spawning bed, an installation used in fishery management to increase fish reproduction 
 Spawning networks, a type of computer network

See also
 
 
 
 
 Respawn (disambiguation)